Leonardo Mana Hernandes (born 6 April 2004), known as Léo Mana, is a Brazilian footballer who plays as a right back for Corinthians.

Club career
Born in São Paulo, Léo Mana joined Corinthians' youth setup in 2014, aged ten. On 7 July 2021, he signed his first professional contract with the club, until 2024.

Léo Mana made his first team – and Série A – debut on 18 September 2022, starting in a 1–0 away loss against América Mineiro.

Career statistics

References

2004 births
Living people
Footballers from São Paulo
Brazilian footballers
Association football defenders
Campeonato Brasileiro Série A players
Sport Club Corinthians Paulista players